The 81st Pennsylvania Volunteer Infantry was an infantry regiment that served in the Union Army during the American Civil War.

Service
The 81st Pennsylvania Infantry was organized at Philadelphia, Pennsylvania, for a three-month enlistment beginning August 6, 1861, and continuing through October 27, 1861, under the command of Colonel James Miller.

The regiment was attached to Howard's Brigade, Richardson's Division, Army of the Potomac, to March 1862. 1st Brigade, 1st Division, II Corps, Army of the Potomac, to June 1865.

The 81st Pennsylvania Infantry mustered out of service on June 29, 1865.

Detailed service
At Easton, Pa., until October 10. Moved to Washington, D.C., October 10. Duty in the defenses of Washington, D.C., until March 1862. Advance on Manassas, Va., March 10–15. Reconnaissance to Gainesville March 20. Operations on Orange & Alexandria Railroad March 28–31. Ordered to the Virginia Peninsula. Siege of Yorktown April 5-May 4. Construction of Grape Vine Bridge on Chickahominy May 28–30. Battle of Seven Pines May 31-June 1. Fair Oaks June 18. Fair Oaks Station June 21. Seven days before Richmond June 25-July 1. Orchard Station June 28. Peach Orchard, Allen's Farm, June 29. Savage Station June 29. White Oak Swamp Bridge, and Glendale June 30. Malvern Hill July 1. At Harrison's Landing until August 16. Movement to Fortress Monroe, then to Alexandria and Centreville August 16–30. Centreville September 1. Maryland Campaign September 6–24. Battle of Antietam, September 16–17. Moved to Harper's Ferry and duty there until October 29. Reconnaissance to Charlestown October 16–17. Advance up Loudon Valley and movement to Falmouth, Va., October 29-November 17. Snicker's Gap November 2. Manassas Gap November 5–6. Battle of Fredericksburg, December 12–15. At Falmouth until April 1863. Chancellorsville Campaign April 27-May 6. Battle of Chancellorsville May 1–5. Reconnaissance to the Rappahannock June 9. Kelly's Ford June 10. Gettysburg Campaign June 13-July 24. Battle of Gettysburg July 1–3. Pursuit of Lee July 5–24. Duty on line of the Rappahannock until September. Advance from the Rappahannock to the Rapidan September 13–17. Bristoe Campaign October 9–22. Auburn and Bristoe October 14. Advance to line of the Rappahannock November 7–8. Mine Run Campaign November 26-December 2. Mine Run November 28–30. At Stevensburg until May, 1864. Demonstration on the Rapidan February 6–7. Rapidan Campaign May 4-June 12. Battles of the Wilderness May 5–7; Corbin's Bridge May 8; Spotsylvania May 8–12; Po River May 10; Spotsylvania Court House May 12–21. Assault on the Salient May 12. Landen House May 18. North Anna River May 23–26. Line of the Pamunkey May 26–28. Totopotomoy May 28–31. Cold Harbor June 12. Before Petersburg June 16–18. Siege of Petersburg June 16, 1864, to April 2, 1865. Jerusalem Plank Road June 22–23, 1864. Demonstration north of the James at Deep Bottom July 27–29. Deep Bottom July 27–28. Mine Explosion, Petersburg, July 30 (reserve). Demonstration north of the James at Deep Bottom August 13–20. Strawberry Plains, Deep Bottom, August 14–18. Ream's Station August 25. Reconnaissance to Hatcher's Run December 7–10. Hatcher's Run December 8. Dabney's, Mills, Hatcher's Run, February 5–7, 1865. Watkins' House, Petersburg, March 25. Appomattox Campaign March 28-April 9. On line of Hatcher's and Gravelly Runs March 29–30. Hatcher's Run or Boydton Road March 31. White Oak Road March 31. Sutherland Station April 2. Sailor's Creek April 6. High Bridge, Farmville, April 7. Appomattox Courthouse April 9. Surrender of Lee and his army. March to Washington, D.C., May 2–12. Grand Review of the Armies May 23.

Casualties
The regiment lost a total of 306 men during service; 18 officers and 190 enlisted men killed or mortally wounded, 2 officers and 96 enlisted men died from disease-related causes.

Commanders
 Colonel Abram Wakeman - resigned in favor of Miller
 Colonel James Miller - killed in action at the Battle of Seven Pines
 Colonel Henry Boyd McKeen - mortally wounded at the Battle of Cold Harbor while in command of a brigade
 Lieutenant Colonel Amos Stroh - commanded at the Battle of Gettysburg
 Lieutenant Colonel William Wilson - commanded at the First Battle of Deep Bottom and during the Appomattox Campaign

Notable members
 Private Ching Lee (a.k.a. Thomas Sylvanus), Company D - one of an estimated 50+ Chinese Americans who served in the Union or Confederate Army or Navy during the war

See also

 List of Pennsylvania Civil War Units
 Pennsylvania in the Civil War

Notes

References
 Bonsall, Spencer. Well Satisfied with My Position: The Civil War Journal of Spencer Bonsall (Carbondale, IL: Southern Illinois University Press), 2007. 
 Dyer, Frederick H.  A Compendium of the War of the Rebellion (Des Moines, IA:  Dyer Pub. Co.), 1908.
 Wilson, Harry. Oration at the Unveiling of the Monument Erected by the State of Pennsylvania on the Battle-field of Gettysburg in Honor of, and Upon the Spot Where Fought the Eighty-first Regiment, Pennsylvania Veteran Volunteers (Philadelphia, PA: Spangler & Davis), 1889.
Attribution

External links
 81st Pennsylvania Infantry monument at Gettysburg

Military units and formations established in 1861
Military units and formations disestablished in 1865
Units and formations of the Union Army from Pennsylvania
1861 establishments in Pennsylvania